Danish-Iraqi relations are foreign relations between Denmark and Iraq. Denmark has an embassy in Baghdad and a trade office in Basra; Iraq has an embassy in Copenhagen.

On March 21, 2003, the Danish Parliament decided to support U.S. military action in Iraq and contribute naval assets to the war.

In 2006, the Iraqi Transport Minister Salam al-Malki announced a freeze on all economic relations with Danish and Norwegian companies in protest against insulting cartoons published in the countries' newspapers.

With the total Iraqi population in Denmark numbering around 29,600, there are organizations such as the Iraqi-Danish Culture Days, which are currently organized in the Danish capital Copenhagen.

Iraqi reaction to the Jyllands-Posten Muhammad cartoons controversy 
Shia cleric Grand Ayatollah Ali al-Sistani condemned the cartoons but also commented about militants who discredit Islam by their acts. Sistani underlined how un-Islamic acts of extremism are used as justification to attack Islam.

See also 
 Foreign relations of Denmark
 Foreign relations of Iraq
 Iraqis in Denmark
 Dancon/Irak
 Iraq–EU relations

References

External links 
Iraqi Embassy in Copenhagen 
Embassy of Denmark in Baghdad

 
Iraq
Bilateral relations of Iraq